Michaël Cordier (born 27 March 1984) is a Belgian professional footballer who plays for RFC Rapid Symphorinois as a goalkeeper.

Career
He formerly played for Charleroi, Eendracht Aalst, La Louvière, FC Brussels and Anderlecht. He participated at the 2007 UEFA European Under-21 Football Championship.

External links
 Player profile at Voetbal International

1984 births
Living people
Belgian footballers
Belgium under-21 international footballers
R. Charleroi S.C. players
S.C. Eendracht Aalst players
R.A.A. Louviéroise players
R.W.D.M. Brussels F.C. players
R.S.C. Anderlecht players
R. Olympic Charleroi Châtelet Farciennes players
K.V.C. Westerlo players
Club Brugge KV players
UR La Louvière Centre players
Belgian Pro League players
Challenger Pro League players
Association football goalkeepers